The Kemba Smith Foundation is an American charitable organization which aims to raise awareness of certain social issues, including drug abuse, violence, AIDS, teenage pregnancy, and abuse. It was founded by Kemba Smith Pradia, who was convicted of a federal crime related to crack cocaine possession and had her sentence commuted by President Bill Clinton.

The foundation
Some of the objectives of the Kemba Smith Foundation include: 
to work toward the elimination of prejudice and discrimination in neighborhoods, and combat juvenile delinquency. 
to implement real-life stories into forums that are examples to young people about the detrimental effects of bad decisions and inappropriate conduct.

Kemba Smith
While attending Hampton University, Smith became involved with a drug dealer who "was a major figure in a $4 million crack cocaine ring". She became physically, mentally, and emotionally abused. Smith was sentenced to 24½ years in prison, serving 6½ years before President Clinton's order of clemency. During her stay in prison, Smith gave birth to a son.

Smith is currently an avid speaker on the rights of felons and is working in the state of Virginia to reinstate their power to vote, serve on a jury and run for public office. Smith graduated from Virginia Union University with a bachelor's degree in Social Work and graduated from law school.

"Her story has been featured on Nightline, Court TV, The Early Morning Show and host of other television programs. Along with several publications such as The Washington Post, The New York Times, Glamour, People, and Essence magazines." Smith has also received numerous awards while fighting for the rights of released prisoners and educating the public on topics related to drug policies. Smith also educates the public on current laws and the criminal system. She is involved in a tour sponsored by Procter & Gamble's Tampax "Totally You Tour".

References

Charities based in Virginia
HIV/AIDS activists
American civil rights activists